The 2019–20 season was Northampton Town's 123rd season of existence and their second season back in League Two after a two-year absence. Along with competing in League Two, the club will also participate in the FA Cup, EFL Cup and EFL Trophy.

The season ran from 1 July 2019 to 30 June 2020.

Players

Pre-season
The Cobblers announced pre-season friendlies against Northampton Sileby Rangers, Brackley Town Sheffield Wednesday, Sheffield United and Milton Keynes Dons.

Competitions

League Two

League table

Results summary

League position by match

Matches
On Thursday, 20 June 2019, the EFL League Two fixtures were revealed.

Play-offs

On 9 June 2020, League Two clubs voted by an overwhelming majority to curtail the 2019–20 season early due to the COVID-19 pandemic in the United Kingdom. It was announced the same day that the play-offs would still be played and that positions would be determined on a points per game (PPG) basis. This meant that Northampton Town finished 7th in the League Two table, thus occupying the final play-off spot.

FA Cup

The first round draw was made on 21 October 2019. The second round draw was made on 11 November 2019. The third round draw was made live on BBC Two from Etihad Stadium, Micah Richards and Tony Adams conducted the draw. The fourth round draw was made by Alex Scott and David O'Leary on Monday, 6 January.

Carabao Cup

The first round draw was made on 20 June.

Leasing.com Trophy

On 9 July 2019, the pre-determined group stage draw was announced with Invited clubs to be drawn on 12 July 2019. The draw for the second round was made on 16 November 2019 live on Sky Sports.

Appearances, goals and cards

Awards

Club awards
At the end of the season, Northampton's annual award ceremony, including categories voted for by the players and backroom staff, the supporters, will see the players recognised for their achievements for the club throughout the 2019–20 season.

Divisional awards

Transfers

Transfers in

Loans in

Transfers out

Loans out

References

Northampton Town
Northampton Town F.C. seasons